The Eastern Ghats are a discontinuous range of mountains along India's eastern coast. The Eastern Ghats pass  through Odisha, Andhra Pradesh to Tamil Nadu in the south passing some parts of Karnataka as well as Telangana. They are eroded and cut through by four major rivers of peninsular India, viz., Mahanadi, Godavari, Krishna, and Kaveri. Deomali with 1672 m height is the tallest point in Odisha. Arma Konda/Jindhagada Peak with 1680 m is the highest point in Andhra Pradesh. BR hill range located in Karnataka is the tallest hill range in Eastern Ghats with many peaks above 1750 m height. Kattahi Betta in BR hills with the height of 1822 m is the tallest peak in Eastern Ghats. Thalamalai hill range in Tamil Nadu is the second tallest hill range. Araku range is the third tallest hill range.

Geology
The Eastern Ghats are made up of charnockites, granite gneiss, khondalites, metamorphic gneisses and quartzite rock formations. The structure of the Eastern Ghats includes thrusts and strike-slip faults all along its range. Limestone, bauxite and iron ore are found in the Eastern Ghats hill ranges.

The Eparchaean Unconformity of the Tirumala Hills is a major discontinuity of stratigraphic significance that represents an extensive period of erosion and non-deposition. It is seen at the steep natural slopes, road scars and ravines in the Tirumala ghat roads in the Tirupati district of Andhra Pradesh.

Hill ranges

As with the Western Ghats, these mountain ranges also have local names along the discontinuous hill ranges.

The Ponnaiyar and Palar rivers flow from headwaters on the Kolar Plateau eastward through gaps in the Ghats to empty into the Bay of Bengal; the Javadhu Hills lie between the two rivers. There are waterfalls in remote areas, such as the Kiliyur Falls.

Madhurawada Dome in the Eastern Ghats mobile belt is formed by a tectonic arrangement with the khondalite suite and quartz Archean rocks along the Eastern Ghats north of Visakhapatnam.

The Maliya Range is located in the northern portion of the Eastern Ghats. The Maliya Range generally ranges between elevations of 900–1200 m, although some of its summits soar higher. The tallest peak in this range is Mahendragiri (1,501 m).

The Madugula Konda Range is located in the northern portion of the Eastern Ghats. The Madugula Konda range is higher than the Maliyas and generally ranges between elevations of 1100–1400 m. Prominent summits include the highest peak of the Eastern Ghats - Arma Konda (1680 m), Gali Konda (1643 m) and Sinkram Gutta (1620 m).

The Similipal massif is considered the farthest northeast extension of the Eastern Ghats.

Rivers

The Eastern Ghats are the source area for many small and medium rivers of the east coastal plains of South India.

Rivers flowing through the Eastern Ghats include:
 Brahmani
 Godavari
 Kaveri
 Krishna
 Mahanadi
 Subarnarekha
 Tungabhadra

Rivers originating on the Eastern Ghats include:

 Baitarani River
 Budhabalanga River
  Rushikulya River
 Vamsadhara River
 Palar River 
 Nagavali River
 Champavathi River
 Gosthani River
 Sarada River
 Sabari River
 Sileru River
 Tammileru
 Gundlakamma River
 Pennai Yaru River
 Swarnamukhi
 Kundu River
 Vellar River
 Penna River

Fauna
The endemic fauna of the Eastern Ghats are the Jerdon's courser (Rhinoptilus bitorquatus) and grey slender loris (Loris lydekkerianus). The rare geckos found here are the Indian golden gecko (Calodactylodes aureus), granite rock gecko (Hemidactylus graniticolus), Yercaud slender gecko (Hemiphyllodactylus aurantiacus), other lizards such as Sharma's skink (Eutropis nagarjuni), and snakes such as Gower's shieldtail snake (Rhinophis goweri), Shortt's shieldtail snake (Uropeltis shorttii), Nagarjun Sagar racer (Coluber bholanathi).

Mammals 

Indian elephant (Elephas maximus indicus), blackbuck (Antilope cervicapra), Asian palm civet (Paradoxurus hermaphroditus), small Indian civet (Viverricula indica), Madras treeshrew (Anathana ellioti), common grey mongoose (Urva edwardsii), sambar deer (Rusa unicolor), Indian crested porcupine (Hystrix indica), Indian bison (Bos gaurus), wild boar (Sus scrofa), common muntjac (Muntiacus muntjak), Indian leopard (Panthera pardus fusca), Bengal tiger (Panthera tigris tigris), dhole (Cuon alpinus), golden jackal (Canis aureus), Indian giant squirrel (Ratufa indica), Indian hare (Lepus nigricollis), Asian house shrew (Suncus murinus), tufted grey langur (Semnopithecus priam), Indian flying fox (Pteropus giganteus), bonnet macaque (Macaca radiata), rhesus macaque (Macaca mulatta), Bengal fox (Vulpes bengalensis), smooth-coated otter (Lutrogale perspicillata), jungle cat (Felis chaus), cheetal (Axis axis), Nilgai, Indian boar, Indian Wolf, Indian mole-rat (Bandicota bengalensis). There are about 400 tigers in the eastern ghats.

Birds 
A survey conducted by ATREE in the northern Eastern Ghats hill region identified more than 205 species of birds including the relatively rarer ones like Brook’s flycatcher (Cyornis poliogenys) and Jerdon’s baza. Threatened bird species like the Malabar pied hornbills were also spotted in a couple of habitats. Other bird species found in the Eastern Ghats include the Great Indian bustard (Ardeotis nigriceps), red-wattled lapwing (Vanellus indicus), spot-billed pelican (Pelecanus philippensis), blue peafowl (Pavo cristatus), Indian pond heron (Ardeola grayii), hoopoe (Upupa epops), spotted owlet (Athene brama), greater coucal (Centropus sinensis), pied crested cuckoo (Clamator jacobinus), Oriental white ibis (Threskiornis melanocephalus), Indian pitta (Pitta brachyura), Indian paradise flycatcher (Terpsiphone paradisi), red-vented bulbul (Pycnonotus cafer), red-whiskered bulbul (Pycnonotus jocosus), jungle babbler (Turdoides striata), painted stork (Mycteria leucocephala), black-rumped flameback (Dinopium benghalense), brahminy kite (Haliastur indus), jungle myna (Acridotheres fuscus), Indian spotted eagle (Aquila hastata), Indian vulture (Gyps indicus), and Malabar whistling thrush (Myophonus horsfieldii).

Amphibians 
Up to 30 species of amphibians including the Gunther's toad (Bufo hololius), pond frogs (Euphlyctis), cricket frog (Fejervarya), bull frogs (Hoplobatrachus), burrowing frogs (Sphaerotheca), balloon frogs (Uperodon), small-mouthed frogs (Microhyla), and tree frog (Polypedates) occur here. Endemic ones include the golden-backed frogs (Hylarana spp.), the bush frog Raorchestes terebrans and the recently described caecilian Gegeneophis orientalis and an Ichthyophis species that is known from old records.

Reptiles 
Nearly 100 species of reptiles occur in the Eastern Ghats. Many endangered species are also present, including the mugger crocodile (Crocodylus palustris), Indian black turtle (Melanochelys trijuga), Indian flapshell turtle (Lissemys punctata), Indian tent turtle (Pangshura tentoria), Indian star tortoise (Geochelone elegans), Leith's softshell turtle (Nilssonia leithii), many of which are found in the northern rivers and riverine valley tracts.

Among lizards are the Roux's forest calotes (Monilesaurus rouxii), those of the genera Psammophilus and Sitana, the Indian chameleon (Chamaeleo zeylanicus), the reticulated gecko (Hemidactylus reticulatus), the rock geckoes Hemidactylus giganteus and Hemidactylus graniticolus, the golden gecko (Calodactylodes aureus), the slender gecko (Hemiphyllodactylus aurantiacus), the rare ground geckoes Cyrtodactylus nebulosus and Cyrtodactylus collegalensis, the recently rediscovered Geckoella jeyporensis, Leschenault's snake-eye (Ophisops leschenaultii), blinking snake-eye (Ophisops minor), Ashwamedh's skink (Eutropis ashwamedhii), Beddome's skink (Eutropis beddomei), Nagarjun's skink (Eutropis nagarjuni) and Bengal monitor (Varanus bengalensis). Noteworthy lizards include the endemic, fossorial genera of leg-less skinks such as Sepsophis punctatus, Barkudia melanosticta and Barkudia insularis that are known only from the northern ranges and along the adjoining Eastern coastal plains in northern Andhra Pradesh and Odisha.

Among snakes are the beaked worm snake (Grypotyphlops acutus), the endemic shield-tailed snakes like Uropeltis ellioti, Uropeltis shorttii, the recently described Rhinophis goweri, the endangered Indian rock python (Python molurus), Forsten's cat snake (Boiga forsteni), yellow-green cat snake (Boiga flaviviridis), Srilankan flying snake (Chrysopelea taprobanica), Nagarjun Sagar racer (Coluber bholanathi), green keelback (Rhabdophis plumbicolor), Duméril's black-headed snake (Sibynophis subpunctatus), Indian reed snake (Liopeltis calamaria). Apart from the Big Four Indian venomous snakes, endemic ones like the Beddome's coral snake (Calliophis beddomei) and the Indian green Bamboo pit viper (Trimeresurus gramineus) and the rare King cobra (Ophiophagus hannah) and the Banded krait (Bungarus fasciatus) are also known from parts of this region.

Protected areas

Sanctuaries and national parks of the Eastern Ghats:

National Parks 
 Bhitarkanika National Park, Odisha
 Simlipal National Park, Odisha
 Sri Venkateswara National Park, Andhra Pradesh

Wildlife Sanctuaries 

 Balukhand-Konark Wildlife Sanctuary, Odisha
 Balimela Wildlife Sanctuary, Odisha
 Baisipalli Wildlife Sanctuary, Odisha
 Debrigarh Wildlife Sanctuary, Odisha
 Gahirmatha Marine Sanctuary, Odisha
 Hadgarh Wildlife Sanctuary, Odisha
 Kapilasa Wildlife Sanctuary, Odisha
 Karlapat Wildlife Sanctuary, Odisha
 Kondakameru Wildlife Sanctuary, Odisha
 Kotgarh Wildlife Sanctuary, Odisha
 Kuldiha Wildlife Sanctuary, Odisha
 Lakhari Valley Wildlife Sanctuary, Odisha
 Saptasajya Wildlife Sanctuary, Odisha
 Sunabeda Wildlife Sanctuary, Odisha
 Coringa Wildlife Sanctuary, Andhra Pradesh
 Krishna Wildlife Sanctuary, Andhra Pradesh
 Koundinya Wildlife Sanctuary, Andhra Pradesh
 Kambalakonda Wildlife Sanctuary, Andhra Pradesh
 Papikonda Wildlife Sanctuary, Andhra Pradesh 
 Rollapadu Bird Sanctuary, Andhra Pradesh
 Sri Lankamalleswara Wildlife Sanctuary, Andhra Pradesh
 Cauvery Wildlife Sanctuary, Karnataka
 Cauvery North Wildlife Sanctuary, Tamil Nadu
 Vedanthangal Bird Sanctuary, Tamil Nadu

Reserves 
 Nagarjunsagar-Srisailam Tiger Reserve, Andhra Pradesh and Telangana
 Satkosia Tiger Reserve, Odisha
 Sathyamangalam Tiger Reserve, Tamil Nadu
 Sunabeda Tiger Reserve, Odisha

According to a study published in 2018, the forest cover of the Eastern Ghats has shrunk drastically since 1920 and several plant species endemic to this region face the threat of extinction.

See also
 Coromandel Coast
 Javadi Hills
 Malli Amman Durgham
 Nallamala Hills
 Simhachalam Hill Range
 Sri Venkateswara National Park
 Western Ghats

References

 
Mountain ranges of India
Landforms of Tamil Nadu
Landforms of Andhra Pradesh
Landforms of Odisha

Landforms of Karnataka

Landforms of Telangana
Physiographic provinces